Doncaster, Maryland may refer to:
Doncaster, Charles County, Maryland, an unincorporated community
Doncaster, Talbot County, Maryland, an unincorporated community
Doncaster Town Site, a historic village